Vive la France! is an extant 1918 silent film war drama directed by Roy William Neill and starring Dorothy Dalton. It was distributed by Famous Players-Lasky and Paramount Pictures.

Plot

Cast
Dorothy Dalton - Genevieve Bouchette
Edmund Lowe - Jean Picard
Fred Starr - Captain Heinrich May
Tom Guise - Colonel Bouchier
Bert Woodruff - Pierre Le Gai
Bert Sprotte - German Seargeant
Eunice Woodruff -

Preservation status
A copy exists in a European archive, the Cinematheque Royale de Belgique, Brussels.

References

External links
 
 
 lobby poster

1918 films
American silent feature films
Films directed by Roy William Neill
Paramount Pictures films
American black-and-white films
American war drama films
1910s war drama films
1918 drama films
1910s American films
Silent American drama films
Silent war drama films
1910s English-language films